The Great Wheel, also known as the Gigantic Wheel, or Graydon Wheel, was built for the Empire of India Exhibition at Earls Court, London, in the United Kingdom. Construction began in March 1894 at the works of Maudslay, Sons and Field in Greenwich and it opened to the public on 17 July 1895. It stayed in service until 1906, by which time its 40 cars (each with a capacity of 30 persons) had carried over 2.5 million passengers. It was demolished in 1907 following its last use with the Imperial Austrian Exhibition of 1906 as it was no longer profitable to run.

References

External links 

Ferris wheels in the United Kingdom
Former Ferris wheels
Demolished buildings and structures in London
Buildings and structures completed in 1895
Buildings and structures demolished in 1907
Earls Court
1890s in London
1900s in London